PNA Dr. Bernardo A. Houssay (MOV-1) is a ketch rigged sail training and research vessel for the Argentine Naval Prefecture. Originally named the RV Atlantis, she served as the first and main research vessel for the Woods Hole Oceanographic Institution from 1931 to 1966. Having sailed over 1,300,000 miles to date, she is the oldest serving oceanographic research vessel in the world.


Woods Hole history
Atlantis was the first Woods Hole Oceanographic Institution research vessel and the first ship built specifically for interdisciplinary research in marine biology, marine geology and physical oceanography. The 460-ton Marconi Ketch originally carried a crew of 17 and had room for 5 scientists. Columbus Iselin II, her first master and a major influence in her design, felt that steadiness, silence and cruising range were of greater importance than speed. After her construction was complete, WHOI searched for an appropriate name for the new vessel. Alexander Forbes (1882–1965), a trustee of WHOI, had recently bought a schooner named Atlantis from Iselin. Mr. Forbes rechristened his schooner so the new research vessel could be named Atlantis.

Use of a continuously recording fathometer on Atlantis cruise No. 150 enabled Ivan Tolstoy, Maurice Ewing, and other scientists of the Woods Hole Oceanographic Institution to locate and describe the first abyssal plain in the summer of 1947. This plain, located to the south of Newfoundland, is now known as the Sohm Abyssal Plain. Following this discovery many other examples were found in all the oceans.

The "A- boat" made 299 cruises and covered 700,000 miles, doing all types of ocean science.

Argentine service
In 1966, Atlantis was sold to Argentina, refurbished, and renamed El Austral. She was used as a research vessel by Consejo Nacional de Investigaciones Científicas y Técnicas (CONICET), crewed by Argentine naval personnel. In 1996, she was transferred to the Argentine Naval Prefecture and renamed after Bernardo Houssay. She went through an extensive 3-year overhaul and keel-up refit in 2009 at the Tandanor shipyard in Buenos Aires.

References

Bibliography

Woods Hole Oceanographic Institution
Research vessels of the United States
Tall ships of Argentina
Training ships of the Argentine Navy
Research vessels of Argentina
Ships built in Copenhagen
1930 ships